Rayjacksonia is a genus of North American flowering plants in the family Asteraceae. It is one of several genera with the common name tansyaster.

The genus is named in honor of American botanist Raymond Carl Jackson.

 Species
 Rayjacksonia annua (Rydb.) R.L.Hartm. & M.A.Lane - TX OK NM CO KS NE WY
 Rayjacksonia aurea (A.Gray) R.L.Hartm. & M.A.Lane - Texas
 Rayjacksonia phyllocephala (DC.) R.L.Hartm. & M.A.Lane Tamaulipas, TX LA MS FL

References

Asteraceae genera
Astereae
Flora of North America